Operation Muslim Ibn Aqil (Persian: عملیات مسلم بن عقیل) or "Operation Moslem ibn Aghil" was an operation during Iran–Iraq War which was launched by Islamic Revolutionary Guard Corps and Islamic Republic of Iran Army with the code of "Ya Abal-Fazl al-Abbas" on 1 October 1982.

The goal of the operation was to capture all heights which were overlooking the town of Mandali, Iraq. Another goal of "operation Moslem Ibn Aqil" was to ensure the middle-front borders, liberation of (a part of) Iran's land(s), and rejecting Iraq from the west of Sumar, Iran.

During "operation Moslem Ibn Aqil", Iranian forces were successful in progress at the first stage; their progress rate reduced at the second stage, and eventually could to consolidate the conquered positions.

At the mentioned operation which was done in two steps in a seven-day period, 150 km2 of Iran's land became free, and approximately 30 km2 of Iraq was seized by Iran. Meanwhile, as well as ensuring Sumar, Iranian forces dominated Giskeh heights, Kohneh-Rig and straits of Iran-Iraq border. The operation finally finished on 7 October 1982.

References 

Iran–Iraq War
Military operations of the Iran–Iraq War
1982 in Iran
1982 in Iraq
Military operations of the Iran–Iraq War in 1982